Xavier University Preparatory School was a private, Catholic high school in New Orleans, Louisiana. The Sisters of the Blessed Sacrament founded, owned and operated the school, having opened it in 1915 as what would eventually become Xavier University of Louisiana.

Andrew Vanacore of The Times Picayune wrote in 2013 that "Xavier Prep has evolved over nearly a century into a symbol of achievement for girls from the city's black middle class." The school closed that same year, later reopened as St. Katharine Drexel Preparatory School.

History
Xavier Prep was established in 1915 by Saint Katharine Drexel; its first president was a Josephite priest. It was originally intended to be a revival of Southern University, which had recently relocated from Uptown New Orleans to Baton Rouge due to racist opposition to an HBCU being in the neighborhood.

The school would eventually change its name officially to Xavier, and in 1925 became Xavier University of Louisiana. The university would relocate to its current location in Gert Town while the high school remained uptown.

The school was historically for black children only during educational segregation in the United States. It was coeducational until 1970, when it became an all girls' school.  It opened to all races as a result of desegregation circa 1970.

It was closed in 2013. Alumni then purchased the school building and reopened it as St. Katharine Drexel Preparatory School the same year.

According to Vanacore, the word "sisterhood" was used to describe the school community and its former students.

Athletics

Championships
Football championships
(4) State Championships: 1936, 1937, 1940, 1941

Notable alumni 
James Booker
Piper D. Griffin, Judge, Civil District Court in the Parish of Orleans (1980)
Caroline Hunter
Alden Roche, NFL defensive end (Denver Broncos, Green Bay Packers)

See also
 Black Catholicism
Katharine Drexel
 Xavier University of Louisiana
 Sisters of the Blessed Sacrament

References

External links
 Xavier University Preparatory School website

Defunct middle schools in New Orleans
Defunct Catholic secondary schools in New Orleans
Private middle schools in New Orleans
Private high schools in New Orleans
Educational institutions established in 1915
Educational institutions disestablished in 2013
1915 establishments in Louisiana
2013 disestablishments in Louisiana
Uptown New Orleans
Catholic schools in Louisiana
African-American Roman Catholic schools
Sisters of the Blessed Sacrament
Schools founded by St. Katharine Drexel
Society of St. Joseph of the Sacred Heart